Selbourne is a rural locality in the local government areas of Meander Valley and West Tamar in the Launceston region of Tasmania. The 2016 census determined a population of 68 for the state suburb of Selbourne.

History
The name, with various spellings, has been used for the area since 1853. Selbourne was gazetted as a locality in 1968.

Geography
The Meander River forms most of the southern and south-eastern boundaries.

Road infrastructure
The C735 route (Selbourne Road) starts at an intersection with B72 (Birralee Road) on the western boundary and runs through to the south-east, where it exits.

References

Localities of Meander Valley Council
Localities of West Tamar Council
Towns in Tasmania